María Eugenia is a 1943 Mexican drama film directed by Felipe Gregorio Castillo and starring María Félix, alongside Manolita Saval and Rafael Baledón. The film's sets were designed by the art director Manuel Fontanals.

Cast
 María Félix as María Eugenia  
 Manolita Saval as Raquel  
 Rafael Baledón as Carlos  
 Jorge Reyes as Ricardo  
 Virginia Manzano as Julia  
 Mimí Derba as Doña Virginia  
 Eugenia Galindo as Doña Matilde  
 Salvador Quiroz as Doctor  
 Alejandro Cobo as Jefe de María  
 Alfredo Varela as Martín 
 Ignacio Peón as José María  
 Consuelo Segarra as Rosa  
 Carolina Barret as Mulata  
 Antonio Bedolla as Pedro 
 Julio Ahuet as Emeterio  
 Toña la Negra 
 Eva Beltri
 Trío Calaveras 
 Son Clave de Oro 
 Hermanos Huesca
 Alfonso Bedoya
 Roberto Cañedo

Production 
María Eugenia was the first film María Félix made after her film debut in El Peñón de las Ánimas. During filming, Félix caused a stir while shooting the opening scene of the film, which featured her in a white bathing suit, attracting publicity to Félix. It is the only film in Félix's filmography where she appeared in swimwear.

It was the only film directed by Felipe Gregorio Castillo, who afterwards became a film censor.

Reception 
In his book Más allá de las lágrimas: Espacios habitables en el cine clásico de México y Argentina, Isaac León Frías collects Emilio García Riera's view of the film, calling it a "terrible melodrama." The book Archivos de la Filmoteca refers to the film as a sign of how "the Mexican melodrama [was] so subject to conventions and norms" at the time, noting that the film was directed by a later film censor. María Félix herself would later refer to the film in her autobiography as "a film that had no other importance than to give me experience."

References

External links 
 

1943 films
1943 drama films
Mexican drama films
1940s Spanish-language films
Mexican black-and-white films
Films scored by Manuel Esperón
1940s Mexican films